The Best Years of a Life is a 2019 French drama film directed by Claude Lelouch. It was screened out of competition at the 2019 Cannes Film Festival. It follows the lead characters featured in the earlier films A Man and a Woman (1966) and A Man and a Woman: 20 Years Later (1986). It was Trintignant's final film during his lifetime before his death in 2022.

Cast
 Jean-Louis Trintignant as Jean-Louis Duroc
 Anouk Aimée as Anne Gauthier
 Souad Amidou as Françoise Gauthier, daughter of Anne
 Antoine Sire as Antoine Duroc, son of Jean-Louis
 Marianne Denicourt as La responsable
 Monica Bellucci as Elena, daughter of Jean-Louis Duroc

References

External links
 

2019 films
2019 drama films
2010s French-language films
French romantic drama films
Films directed by Claude Lelouch
French sequel films
Films about Alzheimer's disease
2010s French films